The 2019 Nasarawa State gubernatorial election occurred on March 9, 2019, the APC nominee Abdullahi Sule won the election, defeating David Ombugadu of the PDP.

Abdullahi Sule emerged APC gubernatorial candidate after scoring 926 votes and defeating his closest rival, Ahmed Wadada Aliyu, who received 519 votes. He picked Emmanuel Akabe as his running mate. David Ombugadu was the PDP candidate with Ogoshi Onawo as his running mate. Labaran Maku was the APGA candidate, while Umar Aliyu Doma stood for ZLP. 29 candidates contested in the election.

Electoral system
The Governor of Nasarawa State is elected using the plurality voting system.

Primary election

APC primary
The APC primary election was held on September 28, 2018. Abdullahi Sule won the primary election polling 926 votes against 10 other candidates. His closest rival was Aliyu Wadada, a house of representatives member in the state who came second with 519 votes, while Silas Ali Agara, the incumbent governor in the state came third with 352 votes.

Candidates
Party nominee: Abdullahi Sule: GMD of Dangote Sugar Company
Running mate: Emmanuel Akabe: former commissioner of health, Nasarawa State
Aliyu Wadada: House of Representatives member
Silas Ali Agara: incumbent deputy governor, Nasarawa State
Danladi Envu-luanza
Ibrahim Jafar
Zakari Idde
Dauda Kigbu
Shehu Tukur
Maikaya Mohammed
James Agbazon
Hassan Liman

PDP primary
The PDP primary election was held on September 30, 2018. David Ombugadu won the primary election polling 745 votes against 3 other candidates. His closest rival was Solomon Ewuga, a former senator who came second with 519 votes, Philip Gyunka, a serving senator came third with 123 votes, while Dameshi Luka, a former deputy governor polled 18 votes.

Candidates
Party nominee: David Ombugadu: Serving member of the house of representatives
Running mate: Ogoshi Onawo: Serving member of the federal house of representatives
Solomon Ewuga
Philip Gyunka
Dameshi Luka

Results
A total number of 29 candidates registered with the Independent National Electoral Commission to contest in the election.

The total number of registered voters in the state was 1,617,786  while 686,303 voters were accredited. Total number of votes cast was 681,400, while number of valid votes was 670,879. Rejected votes were 10,521.

By local government area
Here are the results of the election by local government area for the two major parties. The total valid votes of 670,878 represents the 29 political parties that participated in the election. Blue represents LGAs won by Abdullahi Sule. Green represents LGAs won by David Ombugadu.

References 

Nasarawa
Gubernatorial election 2019
Nasarawa State gubernatorial election
2019 Nasarawa State elections